Apterodina is a genus of leaf beetles in the subfamily Eumolpinae. It is known from Brazil, Colombia and Ecuador. It was first described by the Czech entomologist Jan Bechyné in 1954. All species of the genus have greatly reduced hind wings.

Species
 Apterodina achuparia Flowers, 2009 – Ecuador
 Apterodina bechynei Flowers, 2004 – Colombia
 Apterodina bucki Bechyné, 1954 – southeast Brazil
 Apterodina granulifera Bechyné & Bechyné, 1964 – southeast Brazil
 Apterodina ruminyahui Flowers, 2004 – Ecuador

References

Eumolpinae
Chrysomelidae genera
Beetles of South America